Hatton is an unincorporated community in northwest Callaway County, in the U.S. state of Missouri. The community is on Missouri Route E 6.5 miles west of Auxvasse.

History
A post office called Hatton was established in 1882, and remained in operation until 1953. Frank Hatton, an early postmaster, gave the community his last name.

References

Unincorporated communities in Callaway County, Missouri
Unincorporated communities in Missouri
Jefferson City metropolitan area